The Pico Paraná State Park is a state park in the state of Paraná, Brazil.
It protects a well-preserved area of Atlantic Forest, and contains a massif that includes the highest peak in the south of Brazil.
The environment is strictly protected, but visitors in good physical condition may climb the massif.

Location

It is part of the Lagamar Mosaic.
It takes six to ten hours to walk from the park entrance to the summit.
Visitors must be in good physical condition and should be in a group or with an experienced guide.

The park protects  a stretch of the best preserved Atlantic Forest in Brazil.
The park adjoins the Graciosa State Park to the south and the Roberto Ribas Lange State Park to the north.
Fauna include 71 species of mammals including howler monkey, squirrel, paca, hedgehog, coati, common agouti, ocelot and the endangered jaguar and cougar.

History

The Pico Paraná State Park was created by state governor decree 5769 of 5 June 2002 from two areas of vacant land in the Marumbi Special Area of Tourist Interest.
The objectives are to conserve a sample of dense montane and high montane rainforest, the fauna, soil and interior waters, and to promote activities that do not affect the ecosystem and that make  preservation sustainable.
The park was to be administered by the Paraná Institute of the Environment (IAP), which was to prepare and approve a management plan within five years.

Notes

Sources

State parks of Brazil
Protected areas of Paraná (state)
2002 establishments in Brazil